CCPM may refer to:

Concurrent CP/M, a Digital Research operating system
Critical Chain Project Management
Cyclic/collective pitch mixing